In grammar, the terminative or terminalis case (abbreviated ) is a case specifying a limit in space and time and also to convey the goal or target of an action.

Assamese
In the Assamese language, the terminative case is indicated by the suffix  :

Bashkir
In the Bashkir language, the terminative case is indicated by the suffix :

Classical Hebrew 
T.J. Meek has argued that "the so-called locative " in Classical Hebrew "is terminative only and should be renamed terminative ."

Estonian
In the Estonian language, the terminative case is indicated by the '-ni' suffix:

: 'to the river'/'as far as the river'
: 'until six o'clock'

Hungarian
The Hungarian language uses the '-ig' suffix.

: 'as far as the house'
: 'until six o'clock'

If used for time, it can also show how long the action lasted.

: 'for six hours'/'six hours long'
: 'for a hundred years'

It is not always clear whether the thing in terminative case belongs to the interval in question or not.
: 'I stayed until the concert (ended or started?)' Here it is more likely that the person only stayed there until the concert began.
: 'Say a number from 1 to (until) 10.' However here 10 can be said as well.

The corresponding question word is ?, which is simply the question word ? ('what?') in terminative case.

Sumerian
In Sumerian, the terminative case  not only was used to indicate end-points in space or time but also end-points of an action itself such as its target or goal. In this latter role, it functioned much like an accusative case.

Finnish
The use of the postposition asti (or synonymously saakka)  with the illative (or allative or sublative) case in Finnish very closely corresponds to the terminative.  These same postpositions with the elative (or ablative) case also express the opposite of a terminative:  a limit in time or space of origination or initiation.

Japanese 
The Japanese particle まで (made) acts like a terminative case.

See also
 Cessative aspect
 Desiderative mood
 List of grammatical cases

Further reading

References 

Grammatical cases